Édouard Barthe (26 May 1882, in Béziers – 25 July 1949, in Paris) was a French politician. He represented the French Section of the Workers' International (SFIO) from 1910 to 1933, the Socialist Party of France – Jean Jaurès Union from 1933 to 1935 and the Socialist Republican Union (USR) from 1935 to 1940 in the Chamber of Deputies. On 10 July 1940, he voted in favour of granting the Cabinet presided by Philippe Pétain authority to draw up a new constitution, thereby effectively ending the French Third Republic and establishing Vichy France. He was Senator from 1948 to 1949.

References

1882 births
1949 deaths
People from Béziers
Politicians from Occitania (administrative region)
French Section of the Workers' International politicians
Socialist Party of France – Jean Jaurès Union politicians
Socialist Republican Union politicians
Members of the 10th Chamber of Deputies of the French Third Republic
Members of the 11th Chamber of Deputies of the French Third Republic
Members of the 12th Chamber of Deputies of the French Third Republic
Members of the 13th Chamber of Deputies of the French Third Republic
Members of the 14th Chamber of Deputies of the French Third Republic
Members of the 15th Chamber of Deputies of the French Third Republic
Members of the 16th Chamber of Deputies of the French Third Republic
French Senators of the Fourth Republic
Senators of Hérault